Shanghai Zoo is a station on Line 10 of the Shanghai Metro, located in Changning District adjacent to the Shanghai Zoo. It opened in 2010.

References

Railway stations in Shanghai
Line 10, Shanghai Metro
Shanghai Metro stations in Changning District
Railway stations in China opened in 2010